Esteban Vigo Benítez (born 17 January 1955) is a Spanish former footballer who played as a midfielder, currently a manager.

He played the vast majority of his professional career with Málaga and Barcelona, amassing La Liga totals of 240 games and 24 goals over 13 seasons.

Vigo became a manager in 1995, going on to coach several clubs.

Playing career
Known as Esteban during his playing days, he was born in Vélez-Málaga, and had his first professional spell with local CD Málaga, achieving La Liga promotion in 1976. He subsequently attracted attention from country giants FC Barcelona who signed him in December 1976 for 25 million pesetas, and he proceeded to be regularly used over one decade although never an undisputed starter (a maximum of 23 matches in 1980–81). He also scored the winner in a 3–1 Copa del Rey defeat of Sporting de Gijón, in that same season.

Esteban returned to his first club in 1987, retiring four years later at the age of 36. He earned three caps for Spain over a two-month span in 1981 as the nation prepared for its FIFA World Cup, but did not make the final cut. He also represented the country at the 1976 Summer Olympics.

Coaching career
Taking up coaching afterwards, Vigo began in his native Andalusia with UD Almería, and continued to work mainly in the region, also having an abroad spell in Romania. In 2009 he led Xerez CD to their first top-tier promotion but, in July 2009, switched to another side in Segunda División, moving to Hércules CF and achieving the same as runner-up, with the Alicante club returning to the top flight after 13 years.

Vigo was sacked by Hércules on 21 March 2011, following a 0–4 home loss against CA Osasuna; it was the team's fourth consecutive defeat of the season, winning just one point out of 15 possible. He was named the new Almería manager on 4 April of the following year, replacing Lucas Alcaraz.

In July 2012, Vigo returned to Xerez on a two-year deal with the option of two more. He and his three assistants were dismissed the following February, with the team last-placed and seven points from safety (and eventually relegated in that position).

On 17 February 2021, Vigo returned for a fourth spell as manager of Xerez. He led the club to the promotion play-offs from Tercera División, but lost to AD Ceuta FC, leaving in the aftermath.

Outside football
Vigo released his autobiography, titled Ganador (winner), on 13 September 2010.

Honours

Player
Barcelona
La Liga: 1984–85
Copa del Rey: 1977–78, 1980–81, 1982–83
Supercopa de España: 1983
Copa de la Liga: 1983, 1986
UEFA Cup Winners' Cup: 1978–79, 1981–82

Málaga
Segunda División: 1987–88

Manager
Xerez
Segunda División: 2008–09

References

External links

1955 births
Living people
People from Vélez-Málaga
Sportspeople from the Province of Málaga
Spanish footballers
Footballers from Andalusia
Association football midfielders
La Liga players
Segunda División players
Atlético Malagueño players
CD Málaga footballers
CA Marbella footballers
FC Barcelona players
Spain under-23 international footballers
Spain amateur international footballers
Spain B international footballers
Spain international footballers
Olympic footballers of Spain
Footballers at the 1976 Summer Olympics
Spanish football managers
La Liga managers
Segunda División managers
Segunda División B managers
Tercera División managers
UD Almería managers
Xerez CD managers
Córdoba CF managers
UE Lleida managers
Hércules CF managers
Liga I managers
FC Dinamo București managers
Spanish expatriate football managers
Expatriate football managers in Romania
Spanish expatriate sportspeople in Romania